Snežana Bogdanović (born 5 November 1960) is a Serbian film and television actress.

Selected filmography
 Moj brat Aleksa  (1991)
 The Original of the Forgery (1991)
 Courage the Cowardly Dog (2002)
 Stitches (2019)
 The Son (2019)

External links

References

1960 births
Living people
People from Zemun
Actresses from Belgrade
Serbian television actresses
Serbian film actresses
Yugoslav film actresses
Yugoslav television actresses
Golden Arena winners